The 1995–96 season was the first in the history of Canberra Cosmos. It was also the first season in the National Soccer League. In addition to the domestic league, they also participated in the NSL Cup. Canberra Cosmos finished 9th in their National Soccer League season, and were eliminated in the NSL Cup semi-finals by South Melbourne.

Players

Competitions

Overview

National Soccer League

League table

Results by round

Matches

NSL Cup

Statistics

Appearances and goals
Players with no appearances not included in the list.

Clean sheets

References

Canberra Cosmos FC seasons